Horipsestis kisvaczak is a moth in the family Drepanidae. It is found in Yunnan in China, Vietnam, Thailand and Laos.

References

Moths described in 2007
Thyatirinae